Rae Drake Sr. (September 8, 1926 – December 12, 2013) was an American football player and coach. He was the head football coach at Northern Michigan University from 1971 to 1973, compiling a record of 11–18–1. Before Northern Michigan, Drake was a high school football coach at Kingsford, Michigan for 11 years.

Head coaching record

College

References

1926 births
2013 deaths
Northern Michigan Wildcats football coaches
High school football coaches in Michigan
People from Iron County, Michigan
Players of American football from Michigan